Nanawa is a town in the Presidente Hayes department of Paraguay. The urban area is divided by the Pilcomayo River from the city of Clorinda in the country of Argentina.

Sources 
World Gazeteer: Paraguay – World-Gazetteer.com

Populated places in the Presidente Hayes Department